Gensler is a global design and architecture firm founded in San Francisco, California, in 1965.

In 2021, Gensler generated $1.235 billion in revenue, the most of any architecture firm in the U.S. As of 2021, Gensler operated offices in 49 cities in 16 countries worldwide, working for clients in over 100 countries.

History
Art Gensler, along with his wife Drue Gensler and their associate James Follett, founded the firm in 1965. They originally focused on corporate interiors, for newly constructed office buildings including the Alcoa Building (1967) and the Bank of America Building (1969), both in San Francisco. The firm has since diversified into numerous forms of architecture and design, including commercial office buildings, retail centers, airports, education facilities, entertainment complexes, planning and urban design, mission-critical facilities, consulting, brand design, and other areas.

Gensler grew rapidly with offices opening around the U.S. in the 1970s and 1980s and then overseas in the 1980s and 1990s. In 1972, the firm established an office in Houston to provide interior design services for Pennzoil Company's 600,000-sq-ft corporate headquarters. In 1979, the firm opened its New York office to provide interior design and production services for Mobil Oil Corporation's corporate headquarters in Fairfax, Virginia. In 1988, the firm launched its first overseas office in London, followed by new offices in Tokyo and Hong Kong in 1993. In 2002, Gensler opened an office in Shanghai, establishing a permanent presence in China. By the early 2000s, Gensler was the largest architecture and design company headquartered in the U.S.

In 2005, Gensler's board of directors extended the firm's collaborative leadership structure by naming Andy Cohen, Diane Hoskins, and David Gensler as executive directors/Co-CEOs. Cohen and Hoskins continue their tenure as Co-CEOs.

In 2015, the firm celebrated its 50th anniversary..

Influence and industry impact
As the firm's global footprint has grown, Gensler has launched megaprojects such as CityCenter (Gensler served as Executive Architect of the 67-acre, 18 million-square-foot “city within a city” in Las Vegas), SFO Airport (beginning with the Central Terminal project in 1980 and continuing with comprehensive T2, T3, and T1 renovations), and Shanghai Tower (a 128-story mixed-use tower). In 2013, the 2,073-foot Shanghai Tower became China's tallest building, and the second-tallest in the world.

Research
In 2005, Gensler debuted its first U.K. Workplace Survey, followed by a U.S. Workplace Survey in 2006, and the formal establishment of the Gensler Research program in 2007. The firm launched subsequent U.S. & U.K. Workplace Surveys in 2008, 2013, and 2016. Gensler's Workplace Surveys now encompass five continents, with surveys in Australia, China, France, Germany, India, Japan, Latin America, the Middle East, U.K., and the U.S. In 2010, Gensler's research program secured a registered trademark for its Workplace Performance Index (WPI), a trademarked pre- and post-occupancy tool. In 2017, Gensler celebrated the 10th anniversary of the Gensler Research Program (now the Gensler Research Institute) with the publication of Gensler's Research Catalogue, Volume 2. In 2017, the firm launched the Gensler Experience Index, which quantifies the direct impact design has on experience, followed by industry reports in the Education, Healthcare, Residential, Retail, and Hospitality sectors. In 2020, the firm launched Gensler's City Pulse Survey, surveying residents in four cities during lockdown due to COVID-19, followed by another City Pulse Survey in 2021, surveying 10 cities to see how the pandemic has reshaped urban life.

Programs and initiatives
In 1990, Gensler established Gensler University, the firm's chief platform for leadership development. Subsequently, the firm established the Diversity Scholarship, a juried program that recognizes emerging talent among African-American college students enrolled in an accredited architectural program, and the Gensler Brinkmann Scholarship Fund, which was established in 1999 as a memorial to Donald G. Brinkmann, a gifted interior designer and former partner at Gensler. In 2007, the firm established its gServe community impact program. Gensler's Community Impact program encourages offices to dedicate at least 80 percent of their Community Impact resources to one or more of four themes: Housing and Homelessness, Health and Wellness, the Environment, and the Next Generation.

In 2015, Gensler signed the Paris Pledge for Action at the COP21 conference, pledging to reduce carbon emissions to limit climate change to less than 2 degrees Celsius. At the U.N. Climate Action Summit in 2019, Co-CEO Diane Hoskins announced the Gensler Cities Climate Challenge (GC3), which challenges the architecture and design industry to eliminate all greenhouse gases associated with the built environment. To further that pledge, Gensler is launching new green specifications that focus on reducing high-carbon materials. Gensler's “Impact Through Design” report, launched in 2016, explores strategies for architecture and design to play a greater role in global climate change strategy and mitigation, reinforcing this commitment to sustainability with the firm's subsequent “Impact by Design” reports in 2017, 2018, 2019, 2020, and 2021.

Recognition

Gensler was awarded the Architecture Firm Award in 2000 by the American Institute of Architects.

In 2009, Gensler became the first firm inducted into the Interior Design Hall of Fame.

Gensler received the AIA Institute Honor Award for Architecture for the HyundaiCard Air Lounge in 2012 and the Jackson Hole Airport in 2014.

For the third year in a row, Forbes included Gensler among “America’s Best Midsize Employers” in 2018.

Gensler received the highest ranking on Interior Design magazine's “Top 100 Giants” list.

Gensler was included among Glassdoor's Best Places to Work 2020.

The National Center for Employee Ownership named Gensler the 21st largest employee-owned company in the U.S. on the NCEO 2020 Employee Ownership 100.

The AIA Committee on the Environment named three Gensler projects winners of the COTE Top Ten Awards, recognizing the Ford Foundation Center for Social Justice, UPCycle, and Etsy headquarters for integrating design excellence and sustainable performance.

Gensler received the #1 rank overall in Building Design's 2021 World Architecture 100 Rankings.

For a decade, Gensler has topped Architectural Record's annual list of the Top 300 Architecture Firms in the U.S.

For the third year, Fast Company named Gensler among the “World’s Most Innovative Companies 2021” as one of the 10 Most Innovative Companies in Architecture.

Fast Company ranked Gensler among the 100 Best Workplaces for Innovators in 2021, recognizing the firm's new proprietary NFORM Ecosystem.

Engineering News-Record ranked Gensler as the #1 Top Green Design Firm for six consecutive years, from 2016-2021. The firm was second in the latest ranking in September of 2022.

Notable projects 

1888 Studios, Bayonne, New Jersey, 2022
Mineta San Jose International Airport Terminal B, San Jose, California, 2010
Tŷ William Morgan, Cardiff, United Kingdom, 2020
Banc of California Stadium- Los Angeles, California, 2018
The Avenues, Phase IV, Kuwait City, Kuwait, 2018
NVIDIA Corporate Campus, Santa Clara, California, 2018
Ford Foundation Center for Social Justice, New York, NY, 2018 
Incheon International Airport, T2, Incheon, South Korea, 2018 
21st Century Fox, 1211 Avenue of the Americas, New York, NY, 2018 
Costa Rica Convention Center, Heredia, Costa Rica, 2018
Westfield Century City, Los Angeles, CA, 2018 
Fairmont Austin, Austin, Texas, 2018
Johnson Controls HQ Asia Pacific, Shanghai, China, 2017
BCG NY Headquarters, New York, NY, 2017 
Cadillac House, New York, NY, 2017 
E. & J. Gallo Winery Dry Creek Building, Modesto, California, 2017
Burj Alshaya Four Seasons, Kuwait City, Kuwait, 2017
Hyatt Headquarters, Chicago, Illinois, 2017
The Coca-Cola Company Headquarters, Atlanta, Georgia, 2016
The Washington Post, Washington, DC, 2016
Westin DEN and Transit Center, Denver, Colorado, 2015
Jackson Hole Airport, Jackson Hole, Wyoming, 2015
Condé Nast Headquarters, New York, New York, 2015
Shanghai Tower, Shanghai, China, 2015
The Tower at PNC Plaza, Pittsburgh, Pennsylvania, 2014
Gratz Center, Fourth Presbyterian Church, Chicago, Illinois, 2012
San Francisco International Airport Terminal 2, San Francisco, CA, 2011
Ritz-Carlton Hotel and Residences and JW Marriott at L.A. LIVE, Los Angeles, California, 2010
CityCenter, Las Vegas, Nevada, 2009
John F. Kennedy International Airport, JetBlue T5, New York City, New York, 2008
The New York Times Building, New York, NY, 2007
2000 Avenue of the Stars, Los Angeles, California, 2007
Letterman Digital Arts Center, Presidio of San Francisco, California, 2005
The Gate, Dubai International Finance Centre, Dubai, UAE, 2004
Moscone Center, San Francisco, California, 2003
DreamWorks Animation, Glendale, California, 1997

References

Further reading

Kiger, Patrick. (July 23, 2018). “Designing for the Driverless Age”. Urban Land.
Raskin, Laura (June 1, 2018). “The Future of Practice: Extra Large Firms”. Architectural Record.
Caulfield, John. (October 31, 2018). “In Its latest Design Forecast, Gensler emphasizes the human touch”. Building Design + Construction.
“Are Single-Use Spaces Becoming Obsolete?” (November 28, 2018). CityLab.

Architecture firms based in California
Companies based in San Francisco
Design companies established in 1965
American companies established in 1965
Architecture in the San Francisco Bay Area
Gensler buildings
1965 establishments in California
1965 in San Francisco